WAES (88.1 FM) was a high school radio station licensed to Lincolnshire, Illinois, United States. It was branded "Stevenson Patriot Radio," a name reflective of both the school's name and mascot. It was owned and operated by Adlai E. Stevenson High School and was run by students of the high school. Its license expired December 1, 2020.

References

AES
High school radio stations in the United States
Lincolnshire, Illinois
Defunct radio stations in the United States
Radio stations disestablished in 2020
2020 disestablishments in Illinois